= UUG =

UUG, according to the genetic code, is Leucine.

UUG is an acronym for:

- Uniface Users Group
- Universal Underwriters Group
- Unix User Group
